Erebia pawloskii, the yellow-dotted alpine, is a member of the subfamily Satyrinae of the family Nymphalidae. It is found in North America in northern British Columbia, Yukon, and Alaska. It is also found in the Sayan Mountains, and from northern Mongolia to Yakutia and Kamchatka. The habitat consists of grassy areas in and above wet tundra, as well as bogs.

The wingspan is 29–38 mm. The wings are dark brown with no slay eyespot’s. The upperside has a submarginal row of orange dashes across both wings. The underside of the forewings repeats the upperside pattern and the hindwings have a row of yellow-cream spots. Adults are on wing from July to mid-August.

The larvae feed on Carex species.

"Erebia pawloskii" is now the accepted spelling for the yellow-dotted alpine, rather than "Erebia pawlowskii".

Subspecies
E. p. pawloskii
E. p. demmia B. Warren, 1936 (Colorado)
E. p. ethela W. H. Edwards, 1891 (Wyoming)
E. p. canadensis B. Warren, 1931 (Manitoba)
E. p. alaskensis W. Holland, 1900 - Theano alpine (Alaska, Yukon, northern British Columbia)

References

Erebia
Butterflies of North America
Butterflies of Asia